The Uttar Pradesh Police (UP Police),, is the primary law enforcement agency within the Uttar Pradesh state of India. Established in 1863 as the Office of the Inspector General of Police, United Provinces under the Police Act, 1861. It is headed by Director General of Police (DGP).

Uttar Pradesh Police is one of the oldest police departments in the Republic of India, and is the largest police force in the world, having about 68 district police department (excluding 7 commissionerates) in it.

The Uttar Pradesh Police is headquartered at Signature Building, Gomti Nagar Extension in Lucknow which was earlier located in city of Prayagraj 

The Uttar Pradesh Police employ around 1,368 gazetted officers, and 231,443 non gazetted uniformed officers. Uttar Pradesh Police is governed by the Department of Home and Confidential of Uttar Pradesh.
The Uttar Pradesh Police is headed by the Director General of Police (DGP) for the state of Uttar Pradesh, who is the highest-ranking (DG) IPS officer of the state cadre. UP Police is the first Indian state police agency to have a highway patrol Unit, the UP-Highway Police (UPHP).

History
The present police system in the country was created following the recommendation of the Police Commission headed by Mr. H.M. Court in 1860, which led to the enactment of the Police Act of 1861 that is in force even today. The same Mr. Court became the first Inspector General of Police (IGP)  of the then North West Province and Avadh which comprised the territory of the present state of Uttar Pradesh. The Police structure was erected in the form of the following eight organizations:
 Provincial Police
 Government Railway Police
 Municipal Police
 Cantonment Police
 Town Police
 Rural and Road Police
 Canal Police
 Barkandaj Guard (to protect the courts)

The Civil Police too continued to grow and Mr. B.N. Lahiri was the first Indian Inspector General of Police of Uttar Pradesh after independence. The performance of the state police in the spheres of Crime control and maintenance of law and order was highly appreciated, due to which it had the proud privilege of being the first police force in the country to receive the President's Color on 13 November 1952 by the then Prime Minister of India, Pt. Jawaharlal Nehru. Various specialized wings of the U.P. police have since come into existence for combating organized crimes, economic offences, terrorism, etc.

Organization and structure 
A Director General of Police (DGP) heads the state police. He is assisted by many police officers. State police headquarters is situated in Lucknow.

For the purpose of maintaining law and order in the state, the state of Uttar Pradesh is divided into 8 police zones. Each zone is headed by an officer of the rank of additional director general of police who is an officer of the Indian police Service. Each police zone is constituted by 2 to 3 police ranges. There are a total of 18 police ranges in the state of Uttar Pradesh. Each range is headed by an officer of the rank of either inspector general of police or deputy inspector general of police which corresponds with the administrative division. Each police range is constituted by around 2 to 4 districts.

District Police Units 
There are a total of 68 District police units (headed by SP/SSP) and 7 Police Commissionerate (headed by CP) in the state.

In each district (except all current 7 commissionerates), the head of the police is the SP or SSP. In the discharge of his duties, he is assisted by Superintendent of Police (SP), Deputy Superintendent of Police (Deputy SP) or Assistant Superintendent of Police who may either be the officers of the Provincial Police Service or Indian Police Service.

The number of SPs and Deputy SPs varies with the size, population, police work, or nature of police work in different districts. The number of SPs and Dy.SPs in districts like Gorakhpur, Bareilly, Meerut, Moradabad is considerably more than other districts. Whereas in smaller districts like Baghpat, Kannauj, Mahoba, Chandauli the number of the PPS officers is relatively lesser.

Typically, a police district in the state corresponds with the administrative district. Though, the head of the police force in the district is the Senior Superintendent of Police (SSP)/Superintendent of police (SP), who is always an officer of the Indian Police Service, the ultimate/final responsibility with regard to the maintenance of the law and order in the district lies with the district magistrate who is an officer of the Indian Administrative Service. The police district is further subdivided into police sub-divisions or police circles. A police circle is usually headed by an officer of the rank of Deputy Superintendent of Police or Assistant Superintendent of Police. The officer heading the police circle/sub-division is designated as the Circle Officer (C.O.) in the state of Uttar Pradesh. A police circle is usually constituted by 2 to 4 police stations. Each police station is headed by a police inspector. Throughout the state of Uttar Pradesh and other states, especially in North India, there is the main police station in the older/ main part of the city known as the Kotwali. The Kotwali covers the main or usually the older part of the town/city under its jurisdiction. Earlier, when the cities and towns were smaller and had a lesser population than at present and they hadn't grown in size so much, Kotwali covered the main town area of the cities or the districts. A police station is also called as a thana in the local language. The officer in charge of a police station is designated as or called as the station officer (S.O.) or station house officer (S.H.O). He is assisted by various sub-inspectors, head-constables, constables. There are also a number of police chowkis that come under the police station. A police chowki is under the charge of a sub-inspector of police. The regular constabulary carries the bulk of normal beat policing and patrolling.

Commissionerates 
There are currently 7 police commissionerates under UP Police -

In the police commissionerate system, the Commissioner of Police (CP) in the rank of Additional Director General of Police (ADGP) or Inspector General of Police (IGP) heads the district police department or commissionerate.

In Lucknow Police, the CP is assisted by 2 Joint Commissioners of Police (JCPs) with the ranks of IG and DIG, in Kanpur Police the commissioner is assisted by 2 Additional Commissioners (Addl. CPs) in the ranks of IG and DIG who look after Law and order while other looks into Crime & Headquarters respectively, whereas in all other commissionerates the commissioner is assisted by Addl.CP(s) of DIG rank. Under them, there is a team of IPS & PPS officers who are posted as DCPs and ACPs.  Three DCPs are posted in a zone. One DCP's insignia is the state emblem above one star, who is senior to the other two DCPs, whose insignia is one state emblem only. Under the DCPs work ACPs, who are the chiefs of various circles. They are vested with the powers of the executive magistrate for criminal cases.

Police Commissionerates are independent of zonal & range police chiefs' supervision. They are also vested with powers of an executive magistrate under various acts.

Ranks of law enforcement in Uttar Pradesh
Gazetted Officers
.

Non-gazetted officers

Police Units

Zones, Ranges and districts

List of UP Police Chiefs

Technology

Facial recognition system 
UP police uses a database of 500,000+ criminals with facial recognition technology in its "Trinetra" face identification system.

Social media research center 
A social media command and research center has been established in Meerut. The center monitors trends in social media that can have an impact on law & order situation and advise concerned district and range police chiefs.

Firearms 
Most of the weapons in service with the Uttar Pradesh Police are locally produced by the Indian ordnance factories controlled by the Ordnance Factories Board, the police also induct various weapons imported by the Ministry of Home Affairs as part of modernization plans.

As per the 2017 audit by the Comptroller and Auditor General of India, Uttar Pradesh Police has a shortage of 45,047 handguns and an excess of 56,298 rifles.

48%, 58,853, of the 1.22 lakh (122,000) rifles available to the state police are of point-303 bore category, which was rendered obsolete by the Ministry of Home Affairs in 1995.

Weapons of the UP Police also include:
 Baton Wooden standard issue weapons
 IOF.32 Service revolver currently being phased out as standard issue sidearm
 Pistol Auto 9mm 1A 9×19mm Parabellum Standard Issue sidearm as service weapons to inspectors and higher ranks as well as to selected constables
 Glock 17 9×19mm Parabellum
 Sten Submachine gun 9×19mm Parabellum  mostly replaced by 9mm SAF Carbine 1A1
 SAF Carbine 1A1 9×19mm Parabellum
 Heckler & Koch MP5 9×19mm Parabellum
 Short Magazine Lee–Enfield Mk III rifle .303 British
 Ishapore 2A1 Rifle 7.62×51mm NATO
 1A Self Loading Rifle 7.62×51mm NATO
 AK 47 7.62×39mm M43
 INSAS Rifle 5.56×45mm NATO
 OFB LMG 7.62×51mm NATO L4A1 variant
 Amogh carbine 5.56×30mm MINSAS

Corruption and misconduct 
The Uttar Pradesh Police has an extensive history of police brutality, misconduct, and corruption, as well as discrimination on the basis of caste and religion.

Corruption in hiring 
In 2007, 18,000 police officers were fired as they were hired despite being unqualified for the job. These new recruits were illiterates who bribed between ₹100,000 and ₹500,000 to cheat in the UP police entrance tests.

Fake encounters 
In 2018 India Today carried out an investigative piece reporting incidents of UP police framing innocent people and killing them in staged encounters for money and promotions. A sub-inspector had allegedly offered to gun down an innocent civilian for around Rs 8 lakh. Between 2015–2018, 211 complaints of fake encounters were filed in India out of which 39 were on UP police. In 2012, 17 UP police personnel were given life term for killing an incontinent 24-year-old man in a 1992 fake encounter and later they branded the victim as a terrorist.

Others 

In 2020, Uttar Pradesh government started an operation to screen allegedly corrupt police officials who will be forced to take retirement.

In the 2020 Hathras gang rape and murder, the Uttar Pradesh Police came under fire, after some officials forcibly cremated the body of the victim girl without the consent of her family. The station house officer of Chandpa Police Station, was transferred for his "failure to promptly act" in the case, as well as humiliating the victim, refusal to file a report, and failure to follow procedures laid down for investigation of rape. The Uttar Pradesh Police has also been severely criticized by the CBI for inaction and delay in collecting samples as well as other evidence, eventually botching up the investigation, which led to the acquittal of 3 of the 4 accused, with neither of them charged with rape and murder. Additionally, the Provincial Armed Constabulary was criticized for allowing kin of accused to enter the premises of the victim's family and threaten them to take back their case.

Political Influence and Interference 

The Uttar Pradesh Police has been criticized for refusal to investigate high profile cases involving political leaders of either ruling or opposition party. Political leaders have also attempted to influence or stop such investigations, or threaten police officials against actions on party leaders or workers.

On 10th July 2015, IPS Officer Amitabh Thakur, who was posted as an IG, alleged that former Chief Minister and Samajwadi Party leader Mulayam Singh Yadav, had threatened him on a phone call. He released the audio of the phone call, in which Yadav is allegedly heard saying certain sentences of threatening nature: Thakur alleged that Mulayam Singh was unhappy about the complaint lodged by his wife Nutan against the state minister Gayatri Prasad Prajapati for illegal mining activities.

The Uttar Pradesh Police was also criticized for mishandling the 2017 Unnao rape case, which involved expelled BJP MLA Kuldeep Singh Sengar. Following the report, 6 officers were suspended for arresting the victim's father and subsequent custodial death, who was also assaulted by the accused's brother Atul Sengar. Following outrage and protests, the CBI took over the investigation and the case was handed to Allahabad High Court. Kuldeep Sengar was convicted in December 2019 and sentenced to life imprisonment.

In Indian culture 

These law enforcement officers have been depicted in Indian cinema through various films. The Dabangg series of films starring Salman Khan are an example of depiction of the UP Police

See also
 National Police Memorial India
 Corps of Military Police (India)
 Emergency telephone number
 UP Provincial Armed Constabulary
 1973 Provincial Armed Constabulary revolt
 Lucknow Police
 Varanasi Police Commissionerate

Notes

References

External links

 

State law enforcement agencies of India
Uttar Pradesh Police
1861 establishments in British India
Government agencies established in 1861